German Presbyterian Church and Hortonville Cemetery, also known as Hortonville Presbyterian Church, is a historic Presbyterian church and cemetery located at CR 121 and CR 131 in Hortonville, Sullivan County, New York. The church was built about 1860 and is a one-story, rectangular wood-frame building, 27 feet long and 41 feet wide. It features a steep gable roof with two stage tower and small spire. The cemetery is located about a quarter mile from the church and contains approximately 100 stones. The cemetery contains the stone foundation of the original meeting house.

It has been listed on the National Register of Historic Places since 2002.

References

Churches completed in 1860
Presbyterian churches in New York (state)
Churches on the National Register of Historic Places in New York (state)
Georgian architecture in New York (state)
19th-century Presbyterian church buildings in the United States
Churches in Sullivan County, New York
German-American history
German-American culture in New York (state)
National Register of Historic Places in Sullivan County, New York